Takla Maryam, throne name Hezbe Nañ was Emperor of Ethiopia from 1430 to 1433, and a member of the Solomonic dynasty. He was the second son of Dawit I.

Manoel de Almeida remarks that the descendants of Takla Maryam had been taken from Amba Geshen by Emperor Zara Yaqob and "exiled to hot lands where there are many diseases"; when his son Emperor Baeda Maryam I, early in his reign, attempted to redress this injury by recalling them from exile, they slew his messengers. Although Baeda Maryam I promptly took punitive measures (which included decapitating 80 of their members), in de Almeida's day they were "still rigorously watched".

Notes 

1433 deaths
15th-century monarchs in Africa
15th-century emperors of Ethiopia
Solomonic dynasty
Year of birth unknown